General elections were held in the Gold Coast (soon to become Ghana) on 17 July 1956. The result was a victory for Kwame Nkrumah's Convention People's Party, which won 71 of the 104 seats.

A new constitution, approved on 29 April 1954, established a cabinet composed of African ministers drawn from an all-African legislature chosen by direct election. In the elections that followed, the Convention People's Party won the majority of seats in the new Legislative Assembly.

Background
A new constitution, approved on 29 April 1954, established a cabinet composed of African ministers drawn from an all-African legislature chosen by direct election. In the elections that followed, the Convention People's Party won the majority of seats in the new Legislative Assembly. In May 1956, Prime Minister Nkrumah's government issued a white paper containing proposals for Gold Coast independence. The British Government stated it would agree to a firm date for independence if a reasonable majority for such a step were obtained in the Gold Coast Legislative Assembly after a general election.

Results

Aftermath
After pro-independence parties won a convincing majority, the British government agreed to grant the colony independence. This happened on 6 March 1957, with the country renamed Ghana. Initially a constitutional monarchy with Elizabeth II as head of State, the country's democratic credentials were hampered by the Preventive Detention Act (1958). In 1960 a referendum resulted in the country becoming a republic with a presidential form of government, and in 1964 it became a one-party state. Nkrumah was eventually overthrown in 1966.

See also
List of MLAs elected in the 1956 Gold Coast legislative election

References

Elections in Ghana
Gold Coast
General
Gold Coast
Election and referendum articles with incomplete results